Star-Crossed: Unveiled was the concert tour by American singer-songwriter Kacey Musgraves in support of her fifth studio album, Star-Crossed (2021). It began on  January 19, 2022, in Saint Paul, Minnesota, and took place across cities in North America, Europe and Japan. It concluded in Austin, Texas on October 16, comprising 27 shows. King Princess and MUNA served as opening acts during the first leg of the tour in North America.

Background
On 30 August 2021, Kacey Musgraves formally announced Star-Crossed: Unveiled, with 15 shows across North America in January and February the following year. Tickets went on sale September 9, with an American Express presale running from September 2 until September 8. A music video for her single "justified" was released in conjunction with the tour announcement. Only the show in Toronto was cancelled due to the severe weather conditions. On 25 May 2021, The Primavera Sound Festival announced its 2022 line up. Musgraves was originally set to perform at the festival back in 2020 but the festival was cancelled due to the COVID-19 pandemic. On 4 February 2022, Musgraves was announced to headline the Hampton Court Palace Festival and on 10 May 2022 Musgraves was announced to headline the Austin City Limits Festival. On 24 June 2022, Adele announced Musgraves as her support for her two  July 2022 shows in  Hyde Park, London.

Set list 
This set list is representative of the show on January 19, 2022, in Saint Paul. It is not representative of all concerts for the duration of the tour.
 "Star-Crossed"
 "Good Wife"
 "Cherry Blossom"
 "Simple Times"
 "Breadwinner"
 "Golden Hour"
 "Butterflies" 
 "Lonely Weekend"
 "Space Cowboy"
 "High Horse"
 "Camera Roll"
 "Hookup Scene"
 "Merry Go 'Round"
 "No Scrubs" (TLC cover)
 "Justified"
 "There Is A Light"
 "Gracias a la vida" (Violeta Parra cover)
 "Slow Burn"
 "Rainbow"

Notes
 Starting with the show in Barcelona, "Dreams" was permanently added to the set list in place of "No Scrubs", "Hookup Scene" and "Gracias a la vida" were also permanently removed from the set list. "Cherry Blossom", "Space Cowboy", "Camera Roll" & "Merry Go 'Round" were not performed.
 Starting with the show in Molesey, a cover of Elvis Presley's Can't Help Falling In Love was added to the set list.  
 Starting with the show in Pilton,  "Camera Roll" & "Merry Go 'Round" were permanently removed from the set list.  "Cherry Blossom", "Lonely Weekend", "Space Cowboy" & "Can't Help Falling In Love" were not performed.
 Starting with the shows in London and Werchter, "Space Cowboy" was permanently removed from the set list. "Cherry Blossom" was not performed.
 During the show in Pasadena, Willie Nelson joined Musgraves to perform On the Road Again in place of "Can't Help Falling In Love". "Cherry Blossom" was not performed.
 During the show in Chiba, "Can't Help Falling In Love" & "Dreams" were not performed. 
 During the show in Osaka, "Can't Help Falling In Love" was not performed. 
The following covers were performed by Musgraves in place of "No Scrubs":
 During the shows in Chicago, Cleveland, Boston, Washington, D.C., Atlanta, Dallas, Oakland, "Dreams".
 During the show in Kansas City, "Killing Me Softly with His Song".
 During the shows in Philadelphia, New York City, Nashville, Los Angeles and Pasadena, "9 to 5".

Shows

Cancelled shows

Personnel 
 Kacey Musgraves - lead vocals, acoustic guitar, banjo, mandolin and harmonica
 Rob Humphreys - drums
 Tarron Crayton - bass
 John Whitt - keyboards and MD
 Darek Cobbs - keyboards
 Drew Taubenfeld - guitar, pedal steel and MD
 Benjamin Jaffe - guitar, flute and vox 
 Jon Sosin - guitar, banjo and vox

Notes

References 

2022 concert tours
Concert tours of Canada
Concert tours of Europe
Concert tours of North America
Concert tours of Oceania
Concert tours of Asia
Concert tours of the United Kingdom
Concert tours of the United States